Heuglin's lemniscomys or Heuglin's striped grass mouse (Lemniscomys zebra) is a species of rodent in the family Muridae.
It is found in Benin, Burkina Faso, Chad, Democratic Republic of the Congo, Ivory Coast, Gambia, Ghana, Guinea, Guinea-Bissau, Kenya, Mali, Niger, Nigeria, Senegal, Sudan, Tanzania, Togo, Uganda, and possibly Ethiopia.
Its natural habitats are moist savanna, subtropical or tropical moist shrubland, arable land, and plantations .

References
Musser, G. G. and M. D. Carleton. 2005. Superfamily Muroidea. pp. 894–1531 in Mammal Species of the World a Taxonomic and Geographic Reference. D. E. Wilson and D. M. Reeder eds. Johns Hopkins University Press, Baltimore.
 Van der Straeten, E. 2004.  Lemniscomys zebra.   2006 IUCN Red List of Threatened Species.   Downloaded on 19 July 2007.

Lemniscomys
Rodents of Africa
Mammals described in 1864
Taxonomy articles created by Polbot
Taxa named by Theodor von Heuglin